Cowdeng Chikomba is a Zimbabwean academic. He was the first Vice-Chancellor of the Bindura University of Science Education.

References

Academic staff of Bindura University of Science Education
Year of birth missing (living people)
Place of birth missing (living people)
Living people